IMZ may refer to:

IMZ (file format), a compressed floppy disk image 
Irbitskiy Mototsikletniy Zavod, a Russian motorcycle manufacturer 
The International Music and Media Centre